Lurline Matson Roth (1890–1985) was an American heiress, equestrian and philanthropist from San Francisco, California. She competed in horse shows in the United States, and bred award-winning horses. She donated her estate, Filoli, to the National Trust for Historic Preservation.

Biography

Early life
Born Lurline Berenice Matson on September 3, 1890 in San Francisco, California. She was named Lurline after sugar magnate Claus Spreckels's yacht. Her father, William Matson, was the Swedish-American founder of Matson, Inc., a shipping corporation. As such she was an heiress to the Matson fortune. Her mother was Lillie Berenice (Low) Matson (1864–1930). She had two older brothers, Walter Joseph (1877–1926) and Theodore William Matson (1883–1936). The family wintered in a rented house in San Francisco and summered in a house near Mills College.

She was educated at Miss Hamlin's, a private all-girl school in San Francisco, where she studied music and art.

Equestrian
She competed in horse shows every year and won national medals.

In 1924, her mother purchased the Why Worry Farm in Woodside for Lurline, where she bred horses. She owned a five-gaited horse, a three-gaited horse, a Standardbred road horse, a Hackney horse, a Hackney pony and a jumper and hired a trainer, thus turning it into a show stable. After she stopped competing, her horses won many equestrian awards. Two of her best-known American Saddlebred horses were Chief of Longview (born at Longview Farm in Lee's Summit, Missouri) and Sweetheart on Parade.

Philanthropy
During World War II, she volunteered for the American Red Cross. A decade later, in 1964, she renovated Ghirardelli Square in San Francisco with her son. The renovation cost US$10 million.

In 1975, she donated Filoli to the National Trust for Historic Preservation.

Personal life
She met William Philip Roth (1879–1963), a stockbroker from Honolulu, in 1913. Even though her father was opposed to their relationship, they got married a year later in San Francisco, on May 27, 1914. They had a son, William M. Roth in 1916, and two identical twin daughters, Lurline Roth Coonan and Berenice Roth Spalding, in 1920.

They resided at Why Worry Farm with Lurline's mother, and they had another estate in Hawaii. In 1937, they purchased Filoli, an estate in Woodside, California, from heir William Bowers Bourn II. They often entertained guests at Filoli, including the pianist Ignace Paderewski and the aviator Amelia Earhart, who took her on a plane ride in 1937.

After her husband died in 1963, she lived by herself at Filoli. One of her daughters, Berenice, married Charles F. Spalding, an advisor to John F. Kennedy, television screenwriter, investment banker and heir to the Cudahy Packing fortune.

Death
She died on Wednesday, September 4, 1985, in Burlingame, California. She was ninety-five years old.

Further reading
 328 pages.

References

External links
 

1890 births
1985 deaths
People from Woodside, California
People from San Francisco
American female equestrians
American racehorse owners and breeders
Philanthropists from California
20th-century American philanthropists
20th-century American women
20th-century American people